The 2004–05 Kategoria e Parë was the 58th season of a second-tier association football league in Albania.

League table

Championship playoff
Besa and Skënderbeu finished the season level on points so the Albanian Football Association decided to organise a championship playoff game to determine the winner of the 2004–05 Kategoria e Parë.

References

 Calcio Mondiale Web

Kategoria e Parë seasons
2
Alba